Mount Jukkola is a sharp, pyramidal peak, or nunatak, at the south-central margin of the Guthridge Nunataks, in the Gutenko Mountains of central Palmer Land, Antarctica. It was mapped by the United States Geological Survey in 1974, and was named by the Advisory Committee on Antarctic Names for Lieutenant Lloyd A. Jukkola, Civil Engineer Corps, U.S. Navy, Officer-in-Charge of Palmer Station in 1973.

References

Mountains of Palmer Land